Gnats may refer to:

Plural of Gnat, any of many species of tiny flying insects in the Dipterid suborder Nematocera
GNATS, the GNU bug tracking system
Folland Gnat, a small, swept-wing British subsonic jet trainer and light fighter aircraft first flown in 1955

See also
Gnat (disambiguation)
Nats (disambiguation)